Mimagyrta is a genus of moths in the subfamily Arctiinae. The genus was erected by George Hampson in 1898.

Species
 Mimagyrta abdominalis Rothschild, 1912
 Mimagyrta chocoensis Kaye, 1919
 Mimagyrta pampa Druce, 1893
 Mimagyrta pulchella Klages, 1906

References

External links

Arctiinae